Filip Peliwo defeated the defending champion Luke Saville in the final, 7–5, 6–4 to win the boys' singles tennis title at the 2012 Wimbledon Championships.

Seeds

  Luke Saville (final)
  Kimmer Coppejans (quarterfinals)
  Gianluigi Quinzi (semifinals)
  Filip Peliwo (champion)
  Liam Broady (third round)
  Nikola Milojević (quarterfinals, retired)
  Kaichi Uchida (third round)
  Mitchell Krueger (semifinals)
  Andrew Harris (first round)
  Mateo Nicolás Martínez (second round)
  Stefano Napolitano (third round)
  Joshua Ward-Hibbert (first round, retired)
  Julien Cagnina (third round, retired)
  Noah Rubin (first round)
  Mackenzie McDonald (first round)
  Frederico Ferreira Silva (third round)

Draw

Finals

Top half

Section 1

Section 2

Bottom half

Section 3

Section 4

References

External links

Boys' Singles
Wimbledon Championship by year – Boys' singles